The Asia Rocsta is a four-wheel drive off-road vehicle built by Asia Motors Corporation in South Korea. It was available as a jeep or pickup truck.

The Rocsta is derived from the Korean army's 4WD vehicle, also developed by Asia Motors. Because this model was cheaper than competing 4WD vehicles, it contributed to the increase in popularity of offroad racing in Korea.

Asia Motors launched the Rocsta in 1990, and retired it in 1997. From 1998, the Rocsta's replacement, the Asia Retona, was sold under the Kia badge.

UK sales of the Rocsta ran from 1994–1997, which included both 1.8 litre petrol and 2.2 litre diesel models. Both could be purchased with either a hard or soft-top. Both models were distributed by Kia Motors and used Kia copies of standard Mazda engines, with five-speed manual transmission.

The Rocsta was also sold in Australia between 1993 and 2000.

Variants

Rocsta 1.8 DX Hard Top - Model# AM102 GS. Engine Number begins JF8 being for the Mazda F8 engine
Rocsta 1.8 DX Soft Top
Rocsta 2.2
Rocsta 2.2 4WD
Rocsta 2.2 D Soft Top
Rocsta 2.2 Diesel DX H/Top
Rocsta 2.2 Diesel DX S/Top
Rocsta 2.2 Diesel Soft Top
Rocsta R2 Wagon

Gallery

References

External links

Rocsta pictures
Rocsta and Retona info

Cars of South Korea
Cars introduced in 1990
Sport utility vehicles
Cars discontinued in 1997